Manuel Ruiz Cruz is a former professional baseball player. An infielder, he played parts of two seasons in Major League Baseball, 1978 and 1980, for the Atlanta Braves.

Career
Ruiz was signed by the Braves in 1969 at age 17. He began his professional career the following season with the Magic Valley Cowboys, then worked his way up through their farm system, making his major league debut in 1978. In all, he spent his entire fifteen-season playing career in their organization, including all or part of twelve seasons with the Richmond Braves from 1973 to 1984. He retired following the 1984 season.

See also
 List of Major League Baseball players from Puerto Rico

Sources

1951 births
Living people
Atlanta Braves players
Durham Bulls players
Greenville Braves players
Greenwood Braves players
Major League Baseball players from Puerto Rico
Major League Baseball second basemen
Major League Baseball shortstops
Major League Baseball third basemen
Magic Valley Cowboys players
Peninsula Whips players
People from Santurce, Puerto Rico
Richmond Braves players
Savannah Braves players